Greg Lee (born October 19, 1984) is a former American football wide receiver. He played college football for two years at the University of Pittsburgh, during which time he amassed 117 receptions, 2259 receiving yards, and 17 touchdowns.  He was not selected during the 2006 NFL Draft, but signed as an undrafted free agent in 2006 with the Arizona Cardinals. He signed with the Detroit Lions on May 20, 2008.

External links
Greg Lee at AZCardinals.com
Greg Lee at Sports.ESPN.go.com
Profile at DetroitLions.com
Just Sports Stats

1984 births
Living people
George D. Chamberlain High School alumni
American football wide receivers
Pittsburgh Panthers football players
Arizona Cardinals players
Detroit Lions players
Players of American football from Tampa, Florida